Bolitho is a surname of Cornish origin, derived from Bolitho in west Cornwall. Notable people with the surname include:

Bob Bolitho (born 1952), Canadian soccer player
Edward Bolitho (born 1955), British Army officer 
Edward Hoblyn Warren Bolitho (1882–1969), Cornish landowner and politician
Harold Bolitho (1939–2010), Australian academic and expert on Japan at Harvard University
Hector Bolitho (1897–1974), New Zealand author and novelist
John Bolitho (1930–2005), bard of the Cornish Gorsedd
Thomas Bedford Bolitho (1835–1915), Liberal Unionist MP for St Ives, 1887 to 1900
Thomas Robins Bolitho (1840–1925), English banker
William Bolitho (cricketer) (1862–1919), English cricketer, banker and British Army officer
William Bolitho Ryall (1891–1930), South African writer and biographer, who published under the name of William Bolitho
Bolitho family, Cornish family

Bolitho is also a fictional surname:
Richard Bolitho and Adam Bolitho, Royal Navy officers created by British author Alexander Kent

References

Cornish-language surnames